Lambeosaurinae is a group of crested hadrosaurid dinosaurs.

Classification
 
Lambeosaurines have been traditionally split into the tribes or clades Parasaurolophini (Parasaurolophus, Charonosaurus, others (?).) and Lambeosaurini (Corythosaurus, Hypacrosaurus, Lambeosaurus, others.). Corythosaurini (synonym of  Lambeosaurini, see below) and Parasaurolophini as terms entered the formal literature in Evans and Reisz's 2007 redescription of Lambeosaurus magnicristatus.  Corythosaurini was defined as all taxa more closely related to Corythosaurus casuarius than to Parasaurolophus walkeri, and Parasaurolophini as all those taxa closer to P. walkeri than to C. casuarius.  In this study, Charonosaurus and Parasaurolophus are parasaurolophins, and Corythosaurus, Hypacrosaurus, Lambeosaurus, Nipponosaurus, and Olorotitan are corythosaurins. However, later researchers pointed out that due to the rules of priority set forth by the ICZN, Any tribe containing Lambeosaurus is properly named Lambeosaurini, and that therefore the name "Corythosaurini" is a junior synonym, and the definition had Corythosaurus casuarius changed to Lambeosaurus lambei, and the same for Parasaurolophini. In more recent years Tsintaosaurini (Tsintaosaurus + Pararhabdodon) and Aralosaurini (Aralosaurus + Canardia) have also emerged.

Phylogeny
The following cladogram was recovered in a 2022 phylogenetic analysis by Xing Hai, and colleagues.

See also
 Timeline of hadrosaur research

References

 
Taxa named by William Parks